Pugled may refer to several places in Slovenia: 

Pugled pri Karlovici, a settlement in the Municipality of Ribnica
Pugled pri Mokronogu, a settlement in the Municipality of Mokronog–Trebelno
Pugled pri Starem Logu, a settlement in the Municipality of Kočevje
Pugled, Semič, a settlement in the Municipality of Semič